Hooman Radfar (born July 14, 1980, London, England) is an American entrepreneur and engineer. He is co-founder and CEO at Collective, the first online back-office platform designed for freelancers, consultants and other businesses-of-one.  He is currently a Venture Partner at Expa, a San Francisco-based start-up venture firm and studio where he was a founding partner.  Previously, he was co-founder and CEO of AddThis. AddThis provides the most widely used marketing tools for web site creators. According to web measurement firm ComScore, in 2015 the platform was ranked #1 in AdFocus, reaching over 97% of users in the United States ahead of Google, Yahoo and Facebook. According to TechCrunch, AddThis was purchased by Oracle in 2016 for around $200 million.

Early life and education
At the time of the Iranian Revolution, his family immigrated to England in 1979. Radfar was born in London in 1980. His family later moved to the United States where he was raised in Pittsburgh, Pennsylvania. Radfar graduated from Upper St. Clair High School in 1998. In 2002, he graduated magna cum laude from the University of Pennsylvania with degrees in computer science and economics. In 2004, he earned his M.S. from the Information Networking Institute at Carnegie Mellon University where he researched social networking, multi-agent systems, and their applications to computational economics.

Career

AddThis  
In 2004, Radfar and Austin Fath founded Clearspring Technologies to create a platform for website developers to grow their traffic and engagement, based on their graduate research in web services and social networking at Carnegie Mellon. Clearspring launched the first content sharing and tracking service for web publishers in 2006. The company acquired AddThis in 2008, then XGraph in 2011. Clearspring was rebranded as AddThis in 2012.  AddThis was acquired by Oracle in 2016.

Expa 
In 2014, Radfar moved to San Francisco, joining Expa as an EIR. He became a founding partner at the firm alongside Uber co-founder Garrett Camp and Foursquare co-founder Naveen Selvadurai in 2015.  He led the seed investment program at Expa before founding Collective.

Collective 
Radfar co-founded Collective with Ugur Kaner and Bugra Akcay.  The company officially launched September 29, 2020 and is funded by General Catalyst Investors, QED Investors, Expa, Gradient Ventures, and Sound Ventures.

Other ventures 
Radfar is an investor in 40+ companies including Convoy, Onfido, Sweetgreen, Unit, Fabric, SpaceX and Uber via his investment platform 10e9.

Patents 
Method and apparatus for widget and widget-container platform adaptation and distribution, (2008) - now abandoned.
Methods and apparatus for management of inter-widget interactions, (2010) - now abandoned.
Method and apparatus for widget-container hosting and generation, (2011).
Method and apparatus for data processing, (2012).

References

External links 
 Official Website

Living people
1980 births
American computer programmers
Carnegie Mellon University alumni
University of Pennsylvania alumni
American computer businesspeople
American technology chief executives
Iranian emigrants to the United States
Silicon Valley people
American technology company founders